The Movses Khorenatsi Medal is Armenia's highest cultural award. It is presented by the president of Armenia to people who have significantly contributed to the advancement of Armenian culture. Artist Richard Jeranian received the medal in 2011 and pianist Şahan Arzruni in 2015.

References

Orders, decorations, and medals of Armenia
1993 establishments in Armenia
Awards established in 1993